The Roman Catholic Diocese of Potosí is a diocese located in the city of Potosí in the Ecclesiastical province of Sucre in Bolivia.

History
 November 11, 1924: Established as Diocese of Potosí from the Metropolitan Archdiocese of La Plata

Bishops

Ordinaries
Cleto Loayza Gumiel (1924.11.15 – 1968.12.30)
Bernardo Leonardo Fey Schneider, C.Ss.R. (1968.12.30 – 1983.05.21)
Edmundo Luis Flavio Abastoflor Montero (1984.10.06 – 1996.07.31), appointed Archbishop of La Paz
Walter Pérez Villamonte (1998.03.07 – 2009.11.25)
Ricardo Ernesto Centellas Guzmán (2009.11.25 – 2020.02.11), appointed Archbishop of Sucre

Coadjutor bishop
Bernardo Leonardo Fey Schneider, C.SS.R. (1956-1968)

Auxiliary bishops
Bernardo Leonardo Fey Schneider, C.SS.R. (1952-1956), appointed Coadjutor here
Bernardino Rivera Alvarez, O.F.M. (1976-2000)
Toribio Ticona Porco (1986-1992), appointed Prelate of Corocoro; future Cardinal
Ricardo Ernesto Centellas Guzmán (2005-2009), appointed Bishop here

See also
Roman Catholicism in Bolivia

References

External links
 GCatholic.org

Roman Catholic dioceses in Bolivia
Christian organizations established in 1924
Roman Catholic dioceses and prelatures established in the 20th century
Potosi, Roman Catholic Diocese of
1924 establishments in Bolivia